The 1983–84 Auburn Tigers men's basketball team represented Auburn University in the 1983–84 college basketball season. The team's head coach was Sonny Smith, who was in his sixth season at Auburn. The team played their home games at Memorial Coliseum in Auburn, Alabama. They finished the season 20–11, 12–6 in SEC play. They defeated Vanderbilt and Tennessee to advance to the championship game of the SEC tournament where they lost to Kentucky. They received an at-large bid to the NCAA tournament where they lost to Richmond in the first round.

Notable freshman signees were guards Gerald White and Frank Ford, along with junior college transfers Vern Strickland and Carey Holland for frontcourt help.  Junior Charles Barkley suffered a back injury in the very first game of the season and missed time, but returned for a January 13 home date with then #1-ranked Kentucky.  Auburn upset the Wildcats 82-63, their first victory ever over a #1-ranked team.

After the first-round NCAA loss to Richmond, Barkley left Auburn and entered the NBA draft.

Roster

Schedule and results

|-
!colspan=12 style=| Regular season

|-
!colspan=12 style=| SEC Tournament

|-
!colspan=12 style=| NCAA Tournament

Sources

Team players in the NBA draft

References

Auburn Tigers men's basketball seasons
Auburn
Auburn
Auburn Tigers
Auburn Tigers